Jeff Cundy (born 1 March 1969) is an English amateur snooker player, who spent a number of seasons as a professional between 1991 and 2007.

Career

1991 to 1997
Cundy turned professional in 1991, playing and losing his first match against Tim Norris 2–5 in the Dubai Classic of that year. He recorded his first victory in his next match, beating Philip Minchin 5–2 en route to the third qualifying round of the Grand Prix, where he was eliminated 4–5 by Gary Lees.

Cundy's furthest progression in an event in his début season was in the 1991 UK Championship, where he reached the last 64, beating Jason Curtis 6–2, Peter Bardsley 6–2, Darren Guest 6–1, the young Anthony Hamilton 6–3, Graham Cripsey 6–5, Gary Natale 6–4 and Jim Wych 6–2, before losing 2–9 to Mark Bennett. This run earned him £750, and he finished the season ranked 148th.

Cundy entered thirteen tournaments during his second season as a professional; again, his furthest run was to the last 64, this time in Event Three of the 1993 Strachan Challenge, where he lost 1–5 to future World Championship finalist Nigel Bond.

His best showing in a ranking event came at the 1993 British Open, where he lost 4–5 to Brian Morgan in the last 96. Having earned £1,025 during the season, Cundy finished it ranked six places higher than the last, at 142nd in the world.

The following season began with another qualifying loss in the Dubai Classic, this year 4–6 to Paul Wykes. Cundy had better luck in the 1993 UK Championship, defeating Jonathan Saunders 5–1 and Joe Grech 5–3 before losing 3–5 to Karl Broughton in the last 128.

More mild success followed in the Thailand Open, where Cundy reached the last 96, losing 1–5 to Dave Finbow, and the 1994 World Championship, where he lost 4–10 to emerging star Ronnie O'Sullivan, also in the last 96.

Cundy began the 1994/95 season with a ranking of 138th, and reached the last 32 of the 1995 Welsh Open, defeating Adrian Gunnell 5–0, Jason Greaves 5–2, Mark Davis 5–1, Roger Garrett 5–0, Nick Terry 5–4 and former world number two Tony Knowles 5–1 before eventually losing 3–5 to Antony Bolsover.

He followed this performance with a run to the last 64 of the International Open, where he was defeated 1–5 by Mike Hallett.

£5,125 in prize money earned during this season elevated Cundy's ranking to 114th for the 1995/96 season.

1995/1996 brought two highlights for Cundy, with runs to the last 64 of both the 1995 Grand Prix and the 1996 European Open; he lost 3–5 to Joe Swail in the former, and was whitewashed 0–5 by Ian Brumby in the latter.

Having retained his professional status as the world number 103, Cundy was unable to replicate his good form of the last few seasons in 1996/1997, earning only £490 from reaching the last 96 of the 1997 Welsh Open, where he lost 3–5 to Euan Henderson. He slipped back to 132nd in the rankings, and lost his professional status.

1998 to 2003
Forced to enter the tour qualifying events in 1997/1998, Cundy performed well, reaching the last 64 on four occasions and the last 32 once, and regained his place on tour for the following season.

In 1998/1999, he reached the last 16 of the Benson & Hedges Championship, losing 4–5 to Graham Horne, and the last 96 of the 1998 UK Championship where he again faced Joe Swail, this time losing 1–5.
The next season was uneventful, its highlight being a run once more to the last 16 of the Benson & Hedges Championship; on this occasion, Cundy lost 2–5 to Simon Bedford.

The 2000/2001 season saw a revival of the mild successes Cundy had enjoyed in the mid-1990s, as he reached the last 96 of three ranking events and played in the last 64 of the 2001 Welsh Open, where he lost 4–5 to Paul Davies. His £9,050 earned this season improved his ranking to 105th.

2001/2002 was another dry season; having reached only the last 64 of the 2001 Benson & Hedges Championship, losing 1–5 to Nigel Bond, Cundy earned £4,150 from his appearance in the last 96 of the 2002 World Championship, a match he lost 6–10 to James Reynolds.

2006/2007
Having not progressed any further than the last 80 in any ranking event during the 2002/03 season, Cundy dropped off the tour in 2003. He regained his place for the 2006/2007 season, but won only two matches in ranking events - 3–2 over Ian Preece in the 2006 Grand Prix, and 9–6 over Mark Joyce in the 2006 UK Championship - and resumed his amateur career thereafter.

Amateur career (2007– )
Since 2007, Cundy has occasionally entered Players Tour Championship events, and also the Q-School attempting to win back his place as a professional. He reached the last 64 of the 2013 Indian Open, losing 3–4 to Li Yan, and the same stage of the 2015 Riga Open, where he lost 2–4 to Martin O'Donnell.

References

1969 births
Living people
English snooker players
Sportspeople from Scunthorpe